Salvia urica is a herbaceous perennial native to the mountains of Guatemala, Honduras, Belize, and Chiapas, Mexico. It is reportedly most common in Guatemala, where it grows in a wide variety of habitats from  elevation, in a mild and moist climate. The specific epithet, urica, means "caterpillar" or "cankerworm", possibly describing the tight whorls of flowers, calyces, and bracts before they open.

Glands on the soft-textured leaves give off a slight pleasant aroma when brushed. The flower's upper lip is narrow with short hairs, while the lower lip is wider with white markings.

Notes

Plants described in 1939
urica
Flora of Belize
Flora of Guatemala
Flora of Honduras
Flora of Mexico